Beloyevo is a rural locality (a selo) and the administrative center of Beloyevskoye Rural Settlement, Kudymkarsky District, Perm Krai, Russia. The population was 18 as of 2010. There are 39 streets.

Geography 
Beloyevo is located 20 km northwest of Kudymkar (the district's administrative centre) by road. Ananyeva and Nepina are the nearest rural localities.

References 

Rural localities in Kudymkarsky District